The Listening is the debut studio album by Canadian recording artist Lights. It was released on September 22, 2009, by Sire Records, with global distribution handled by parent Warner Music Group, although in Lights' native Canada the album is released instead by Universal Music Canada under licence. By July 2017, the album was certified platinum by the Canadian Recording Industry Association (CRIA), denoting sales in excess of 80,000 copies.

Critical reception

The Listening received generally positive reviews from music critics. Billboard contributor Mark Sutherland called the album a more accessible take on UK electronic music artists like Little Boots and La Roux. Ben Rayner of the Toronto Star said that people who can get past the saccharine preciousness, overuse of the vocoder and its "decidedly sleepy tone" will find an album that "actually proves itself a lot more inventive and unpredictable than its trappings initially betray." Camilla Pia from NME panned the record for Lights' vocals being "overproduced" and containing "dreadful" songwriting with rote melodies and instrumentation, calling it a "painfully saccharine" cross between Owl City and Ashlee Simpson.

Track listing

Personnel
Adapted credits from the liner notes of The Listening.
 Lights – vocals, production (all tracks); mixing (track 13); layout, design
 The Angry Kids – additional production, remixing (track 15)
 Garnet Armstrong – layout, design
 João Carvalho – mastering
 Caitlin Cronenberg – photography
 Matt Green – engineering
 Colin Munroe – remixing (track 14)
 Thomas "Tawgs" Salter – production (tracks 1–3, 5, 6, 10, 11, 14, 15); mixing (tracks 2, 3, 6, 10, 11, 14, 15)
 Mark "Spike" Stent – mixing (tracks 1, 5)
 Dave "Dwave" Thomson – production, mixing (tracks 4, 7–9, 12, 16)
 Lee Towndrow – photography

Charts

Certifications

Release history

References

2009 debut albums
Lights (musician) albums
Sire Records albums
Universal Music Canada albums
Warner Records albums